David John McKitterick,  (born 9 January 1948) is an English librarian and academic, who was Librarian and Fellow of Trinity College, Cambridge.

Early life and education
McKitterick was born on 9 January 1948 to the Revd Canon J. H. B. McKitterick and Marjory McKitterick (née Quarterman). He was educated at King's College School, a private school in Wimbledon, London. He studied at St John's College, Cambridge, graduating with a Bachelor of Arts (BA) degree in 1969: as per tradition, his BA was promoted to a Master of Arts (MA Cantab) in 1973. He studied library science at University College London, completing a diploma (DipLib) in 1971.

Career
He worked at the Cambridge University Library from 1969 to 1970 and from 1971 to 1986. He was a Fellow of Darwin College, Cambridge from 1978 to 1986. He was elected a Fellow of Trinity College, Cambridge: he served as its librarian from 1986 to 2015 and its Vice-Master from 2012 to 2016. He held the Lyell Readership in Bibliography at the University of Oxford in the 1999/2000 academic year. In 2006, he was made an Honorary Professor of Historical Bibliography by the University of Cambridge.

He is the author of various works on bibliography and library history, including a history of Cambridge University Library in the 18th and 19th centuries.

Personal life
In 1976, McKitterick married Rosamond Deborah Pierce, who became the Professor of Medieval History at the University of Cambridge. Together they have one daughter.

Honours
On 23 November 1989, McKitterick was elected a Fellow of the Society of Antiquaries of London (FSA). In 1995, he was elected a Fellow of the British Academy (FBA), the United Kingdom's national academy for the humanities and social sciences.

References

1948 births
English librarians
Living people
Fellows of Trinity College, Cambridge
Alumni of St John's College, Cambridge
Alumni of University College London
Fellows of Darwin College, Cambridge
Fellows of the British Academy
Fellows of the Society of Antiquaries of London